Dorothy Gordon (born Dorothy Sharp; 13 March 1924 – 18 April 2013) was a British actress. She was the daughter of actors Leonard Sharp and Nora Gordon.

Filmography

References

External links

1924 births
2013 deaths
People from Camberwell
Actresses from London
English film actresses
English television actresses